Alireza Safar Beiranvand (born 21 September 1992) is an Iranian professional footballer who plays as a goalkeeper for the Persian Gulf Pro League club Persepolis and the Iran national team.

Beiranvand represented Iran internationally at the 2015 and 2019 AFC Asian Cups, and at the 2018 and 2022 FIFA World Cups.

In 2017, Beiranvand became the first Iranian ever to be nominated for an individual award at The Best FIFA Football Awards. He has been the best goalkeeper in the Persian Gulf Pro League for four consecutive seasons from 2014 to 2019 and has also been the Iranian Footballer of the Year in 2019. With 23 clean sheets in 37 matches during the 2017–18 season, he ranked as the second goalkeeper in the world for the cleanest sheets.

Early life 
Beiranvand was born in the small village of Sarab-e Yas in Khorramabad County, Lorestan Province, and grew up in a nomadic family. In his teenage years, Beiranvand ran away from home and moved to Tehran in order to fulfil his dream of becoming a professional footballer, where he was homeless for some time.

Beiranvand got married in 2010 at the age of 18, resulting in a son named Taha and a daughter named Barana.

Club career

Naft Tehran 
Beiranvand has played with Naft Tehran since 2011. He made his debut in the Hazfi Cup against Damash on 25 October 2011. There were links between him and the red half of Tehran, Persepolis, but the chairman of Naft Tehran, Mansour Ghanbarzadeh, did not allow him to leave the club. In his first year as the first-choice goalkeeper, Beiranvand led the team to a 3rd place League finish and a spot in the AFC Champions League for the first time in the club's history. On 23 March 2014, he extended his contract with the club until June 2019. On 24 November 2014, Beiranvand provided an assist in their match against Tractor Sazi by throwing the ball into the opponent's half.

He was linked with a move to Persepolis in January 2016, but the move fell through at the last moment. Beiranvand left Naft at the end of the 2015–16 season after his contract expired.

Persepolis 

On 16 May 2016, Beiranvand signed a two–year contract with league runners-up Persepolis. In 2017 Beiranvand extended his contract with the club until 2021. In December 2017, in a match against Foolad, Beiranvand set a League record of going 718 minutes without conceding a goal, which was later broken by Esteghlal goalkeeper Hossein Hosseini.

Beiranvand was named 2018 AFC Champions League semi-final first leg player of the week following his performance against Al Sadd. He was also "Man of the match" and with "Team of the Week" 2nd leg after saved many Al Sadd's chances and help Persepolis to reach the final, His five clean sheets during the competition was the most of any goalkeeper. He was reportedly chosen as one of the candidates for the 2018 Asian Footballer of the Year award, but his exclusion was described by Asian football writers as a big shock, and an outrageous and scandalous event. The following season Beiranvand kept 16 clean sheets in 2018–19 Pro League and claimed Golden Gloves for three Years in a row and four times as a whole.

Antwerp 
In late July 2020, Jupiler Pro League side Royal Antwerp confirmed the signing of Beiranvand a three-year contract for an undisclosed fee.

Boavista (loan) 
On 10 July 2021, Beiranvand joined Primeira Liga side Boavista on a one-year loan, with a purchase option for €1 million.

Return to Persepolis 
Beiranvand joined Persepolis on 31 May 2022 with a new 3-year contract on a free transfer.

International career

Youth levels 
He represented Iran at various youth levels, such as the U-19 team during the 2010 AFC U-19 Championship and the U-22 team in the 2013 U-22 Asian Cup qualifiers.

Senior team 

In April 2014, he was called up to the Iran national football team training camp in South Africa by coach Carlos Queiroz after many Sepahan players could not make it because of AFC Champions League matches, including goalkeeper Rahman Ahmadi. He was also selected in Iran's 30-man provisional squad for the 2014 FIFA World Cup. However, Beiranvand was not included in Iran's squad for the World Cup, without playing any match in pre-World Cup friendly matches. He was called into Iran's 2015 AFC Asian Cup squad on 30 December 2014 by Carlos Queiroz.
He made his debut in a friendly match against Iraq on 4 January 2015, just before the 2015 AFC Asian Cup.

During the 2018 FIFA World Cup qualification, first-choice goalkeeper Alireza Haghighi was denied a visa for entry to Guam ahead of their fixture, alongside left back Ehsan Hajsafi. Beiranvand was thus given his first competitive start for the senior team. However, he was given a straight red in the 72nd minute for a foul on Guam midfielder Dylan Naputi, less than a minute after Iran had used up all of their substitutions, forcing defender Ezzatollah Pourghaz to take on goalkeeper duties.

During the final round of the 2018 FIFA World Cup qualification, Beiranvand became Iran's starting goalkeeper, replacing Alireza Haghighi. In May 2018, he was named in Iran's preliminary squad for the 2018 FIFA World Cup in Russia.

In Iran's last match of the 2018 World Cup, Beiranvand saved a penalty from Cristiano Ronaldo, as Iran drew 1–1 with Portugal. Beiranvand was the starting goalkeeper of the Iran squad at the Asian cup 2019. He was again in the spotlight when he saved a penalty from Ahmed Mubarak Al-Mahaijri, as Iran won 2–0 against Oman. He was again in the spotlight when he saved a penalty from the captain of Cambodia, as Iran won 14–0 against Cambodia.

He was Iran's starting goalkeeper at the 2022 FIFA World Cup, but during the match against England he collided with defender Majid Hosseini; after a lengthy medical treatment on the field, he was allowed to continue, but appeared disoriented and minutes later lied down on the ground and requested a substitution, after which he was taken to a nearby hospital. Headway called the decision to keep him on the field an "utter disgrace" and an "abject failure" of the concussion protocol. He was replaced by Hossein Hosseini, who remained in the starting position for the next match against Wales; Beiranvand then returned for the third group stage match against the United States.

Style of play 

Beiranvand's main trait is his ability to take very long throws. In the 2015 AFC Champions League Round of 16 against Al Ahli, Beiranvand made a throw that reached 60m. On 24 November 2014, he provided an assist against Tractor Sazi by throwing the ball into the opponent's half. Beiranvand is good in aerial duels and has been praised for his athleticism, "outstanding shot-stopping", acrobatic dives, and quick reflexes.

Career statistics

Club

International

Honours 

Naft Tehran
Hazfi Cup runner-up: 2014–15
Persepolis
Persian Gulf Pro League: 2016–17, 2017–18, 2018–19, 2019–20
Hazfi Cup: 2018–19
Iranian Super Cup: 2017, 2018, 2019
AFC Champions League runner-up: 2018

Individual
Persian Gulf Pro League Best Goalkeeper of the Year: 2014–15, 2016–17, 2017–18, 2018–19
Persian Gulf Pro League Team of the Year: 2014–15, 2016–17, 2017–18, 2018–19
AFC Champions League Player of the week: 2018 Semi-finals 1st leg
AFC Champions League Fans' Best XI: 2018
AFC Champions League OPTA Best XI: 2018
Iranian Footballer of the Year: 2019
Asian Footballer of the Year nominee: 2019
AFC Asian Cup Team of the Tournament: 2019
AFC Fans' World Cup Player of All Time: 2020

References

External links

1992 births
Living people
People from Khorramabad
Association football goalkeepers
Iranian footballers
Naft Tehran F.C. players
Persepolis F.C. players
Royal Antwerp F.C. players
Boavista F.C. players
Persian Gulf Pro League players
Belgian Pro League players
Primeira Liga players
Iran under-20 international footballers
Iran international footballers
2015 AFC Asian Cup players
2019 AFC Asian Cup players
2018 FIFA World Cup players
Iranian expatriate footballers
Iranian expatriate sportspeople in Belgium
Expatriate footballers in Belgium
Iranian expatriate sportspeople in Portugal
Expatriate footballers in Portugal
2022 FIFA World Cup players